Sir John Armstrong Muir Gray    is a British physician, who has held senior positions in screening, public health, information management. and value in healthcare. He is currently the Chief Knowledge Officer for EXi, a digital health therapeutic prescribing exercise to people with or at risk of up to 23 long-term health conditions.

He was director of Research and Development for Anglia and Oxford Regional Health Authority and supported the United Kingdom Centre of the Cochrane Collaboration in promoting evidence-based medicine. He held the positions of director at the UK National Screening Committee, during which he helped pioneer Britain's breast and cervical cancer screening programmes, and National Library for Health, and director of Clinical Knowledge Process and Safety for the NHS National Programme for IT.

He was knighted in 2005 for the development of the foetal, maternal and child screening programme and the creation of the National Library for Health.

He was the director of the National Knowledge Service and Chief Knowledge Officer to the National Health Service, a Director of the healthcare rating and review service iWantGreatCare and is Public Health Director of the Campaign for Greener Healthcare.

In 2006 he developed the NHS's framework for value (triple value). He was then the founding Director of the NHS Rightcare programme, trying to change the culture of the NHS to become a higher value organisation. He published many influential Atlases of Variation. He then left to found Better Value Healthcare, and then the Oxford Centre for Triple Value Healthcare, a mission driven social enterprise.

He is also one of the original authors of the IDEAL framework for surgical innovation.

Selected books

References

21st-century British medical doctors
Fellows of the Royal College of General Practitioners
Living people
Year of birth missing (living people)
Place of birth missing (living people)
Knights Bachelor
Commanders of the Order of the British Empire
Fellows of the Royal College of Physicians and Surgeons of Glasgow
Academics of the University of Oxford
Fellows of the Chartered Institute of Library and Information Professionals